Toxic alcohols are a group of alcohols that include methanol, ethylene glycol and isopropyl alcohol. They are alcohols that should not be drunk because of various toxic effects, mostly due to toxic metabolic breakdown products. They are in contrast to ethanol, which is much better tolerated by the human body and is commonly used as a recreational drug, being the alcohol that is found in alcoholic drinks. One notable example of a toxic alcohol is surrogate alcohols.

References

Alcohol
Toxicology